Malodelskaya is a rural locality (a stanitsa) and the administrative center of Malodelskoye Rural Settlement, Frolovsky District, Volgograd Oblast, Russia. The population was 1,348 as of 2010.

Geography 
Malodelskaya is located on Bezymyannaya River, 58 km northeast of Prigorodny (the district's administrative centre) by road. Zapolyansky is the nearest rural locality.

References 

Rural localities in Frolovsky District